Kretchmer is a German surname a form of Kretschmer, which is occupational surname literally meaning "innkeeper", originally borrowed from Slavic languages. Notable people with the surname include:

Ido Krechmer, musician from Israeli band Men of North Country
John T. Kretchmer, American film and television director and television producer
Jerome Kretchmer (born1934), American politician
Jordan Kretchmer, a founder of Livefyre
Steven Kretchmer, American inventor who improved the tension ring.

See also
 

German-language surnames
Surnames of Slavic origin
Occupational surnames